KTME (89.5 FM) is a radio station licensed to serve Reliance, Wyoming, United States. The station is currently owned by Western Inspirational Broadcasters. It currently carries religious programming from Pilgrim Radio.

Translator
In addition to the main station, KTME is rebroadcast on a translator station, K246CZ in Big Piney/La Barge.

References

External links

Official site

Radio stations established in 2010
TME
Sweetwater County, Wyoming
2010 establishments in Wyoming